de Troyes is an Anglo-Norman (or French) toponymic surname which originated in Troyes, France and Mitchell Troy, Wales.

Notable people utilising the de Troyes surname or a variant include:

 Chrétien de Troyes (1160–1191), French poet and trouvère known for his writing on Arthurian subjects
John de Troye (died 1371), Welsh-born Crown official and judge in fourteenth century Ireland, who held the offices of Chancellor of the Exchequer of Ireland and Lord Treasurer of Ireland
 François de Troy (1645–1730), French painter and engraver
 Jean François de Troy (1679–1752), French painter and tapestry designer
 Edward Troye (1808–1874), Swiss-born American painter
 Pierre de Troyes (died 1868), French army captain who fought in Canada
 Olivia Troye (born 1977), American former government official and vice president of strategy, policy, and plans at the National Insurance Crime Bureau
 Raymond Troye (1908–2003), Belgian army officer and writer

Notable people with the given name include:

 Troye Sivan (born 1995), Australian actor, YouTuber and singer

See also
 Troyes, town in France